Metasphenisca quinquemaculata is a species of tephritid or fruit flies in the genus Metasphenisca of the family Tephritidae.

Distribution
Afrotropical Region.

References

Tephritinae
Insects described in 1846
Diptera of Africa